Grabów nad Pilicą  is a village in Kozienice County, Masovian Voivodeship, in east-central Poland. It is the seat of the gmina (administrative district) called Gmina Grabów nad Pilicą.

The village has a population of 460.

References

External links 

Villages in Kozienice County
Radom Governorate
Kielce Voivodeship (1919–1939)